Krešimir "Krešo" Račić (15 August 1932 – 19 June 1994) was a Croatian hammer thrower. He competed for Yugoslavia in the 1956 and 1960 Summer Olympics and placed sixth in 1956. He won a gold medal in the 1959 Mediterranean Games and a bronze in the 1959 Summer Universiade. During his career Račić had a strong domestic rivalry with Zvonko Bezjak, with Račić winning the Yugoslav title in 1954, 1955, 1957, 1959, 1961, 1962 and 1964 and Bezjak in 1956, 1958, 1960 and 1963.

References

1932 births
1994 deaths
Sportspeople from Karlovac
Croatian male hammer throwers
Olympic athletes of Yugoslavia
Athletes (track and field) at the 1956 Summer Olympics
Athletes (track and field) at the 1960 Summer Olympics
Yugoslav male hammer throwers
Mediterranean Games gold medalists for Yugoslavia
Athletes (track and field) at the 1959 Mediterranean Games
Universiade medalists in athletics (track and field)
Mediterranean Games medalists in athletics
Universiade bronze medalists for Yugoslavia
Medalists at the 1959 Summer Universiade